Vinod Sukumaran  is an Indian film maker and film editor. He won the National Film Award for Best First Non-Feature Film of a Director for the film Diary of a Housewife in 2001.

He is an alumnus of the Film and Television Institute of India. He has won the Kerala state Film Award as Best Editor for the Malayalam film Ore Kadal directed by Shyamaprasad in 2007 and Ivan Megharoopan directed by P.Balachandran. His first feature film was Haram in 2015.

Personal life
Vinod Sukumaran was born on 20 January at Palakkad district of Kerala, as the youngest son of K. Sukumaran and M. Karthiyani. After completing his degree (BTA) in Theatre Arts from the School of Drama and Fine Arts, Thrissur, Calicut University, in 1989, he joined the Film and Television Institute of India, Pune in 1992, where he earned his diploma in Film Editing. His first independent work as an editor was the FTII diploma film Veg or Non-Veg (1993), directed by Gurpal Singh.

Career 
Sukumaran was assistant editor from 1995–1999 for Renu Saluja. His first film, Diary of a Housewife, won the National Award in 2002 for the Best first film of a Director in non-fiction category.

He has achieved Mathrubhumi film award as best film editor for AKALE, a Malayalam feature film directed by Shyamaprasad in 2005 and best film editor award for the same film in the same year from Kerala state Film Critic Association.

Sukumaran has chaired or participated on judging panels of multiple film festivals and award shows, including Kerala State Film Award.  His first feature film was HARAM the Malayalam film acted by the Fahad Fasil and Radhika Apte in lead roles.

Filmography

References

Living people
Film directors from Kerala
Malayalam film editors
Indian male screenwriters
Artists from Palakkad
Film editors from Kerala
Year of birth missing (living people)